Miss America 2015, the 88th Miss America pageant, was held at the Boardwalk Hall in Atlantic City, New Jersey on Sunday, September 14, 2014. Miss America 2014, Nina Davuluri crowned the winner, Miss New York, Kira Kazantsev, making it the third consecutive year that a Miss New York won the Miss America crown; New York thus became the first state to have a Miss America winner three years in a row.

Chris Harrison and Lara Spencer returned as co-hosts. The panel of judges included: Gary Vaynerchuk, Marc Cherry, Kathy Ireland, Lee Meriwether, Donald Driver, Shawn Johnson, and retired Army Brig. Gen. Anne Macdonald.

Results

Placements

* - America's Choice

** - Judge's Choice

Order of announcements

Top 16

Top 12

Top 10

Top 5

Awards

Preliminary awards

Quality of Life Award

Other awards

Contestants

References

External links

 Miss America official website

2015
2014 in the United States
America
2014 in New Jersey
September 2014 events in the United States
Events in Atlantic City, New Jersey